Salt, or Yui, is a Trans–New Guinea language of Chimbu Province, Papua New Guinea.

References

Languages of Simbu Province
Chimbu–Wahgi languages